Quercus stewardiana is a species of tree in the beech family Fagaceae. It is widespread across much of China (Anhui, Guangdong, Guangxi, Guizhou, Hubei, Hunan, Jiangxi, Sichuan, Yunnan, Zhejiang). It is placed in subgenus Cerris, section Cyclobalanopsis.

Quercus stewardiana is a tree up to 12 meters tall. Twigs are hairless. Leaves can be as much as 12 cm long, green on the top but white and waxy on the underside.

References

External links
line drawing, Flora of China Illustrations vol. 4, fig. 387, drawings 8-10 at lower right

stewardiana
Flora of China
Plants described in 1936
Taxa named by Aimée Antoinette Camus